Naathan Phan (born August 20, 1988) is an American magician and internet personality.

Phan is a member of the Academy of Magical Arts.

Early life 
He was born in Irvine, California.

When he was 1 years old, he moved to Glasgow, Scotland, where he lived for ten years. He attended Orange County High School of the Arts, where he did musical theatre.

Career 
As a magician, he was featured on America's Got Talent, Estrella TV's Tengo Talento, Mucho Talento, Hollywood Christmas Parade, Syfy's Wizard Wars (S01E06: Birds of a Feather), where he and his partner won and took home the $10,000 prize, and Penn and Teller: Fool Us.

In April 2007, Naathan Phan joined the national tour of Jonathan Larson's rock musical Rent for one performance at the Orange County Performing Arts Center.

Phan was featured in the fifth season of Masters of Illusion on The CW.

Personal life 
He earned the rank of Eagle Scout in 2006. Phan is of Vietnamese descent.

References

External links

1988 births
Living people
American male television actors
American male film actors